Chervettes is a former commune in the Charente-Maritime department in the Nouvelle-Aquitaine region in southwestern France. On 1 January 2018, it was merged into the new commune of La Devise.

Population

Geography
The commune was located near Surgères, Rochefort, and Saint-Jean-d'Angély.

Neighboring communes
Puyrolland

History
An old viticultural commune, Chervettes was marked by an old viticultural properties with a closed heart.  Since the outbreak of phylloxera at the end of the 19th century, the commune subsisted three small areas of winery.  The church known as Notre-Dame-de-l’Assumption was first constructed in the 15th century.  Around the commune, Chiron features an 18th-century built mill.

See also
Communes of the Charente-Maritime department

References

Former communes of Charente-Maritime
Populated places disestablished in 2018